The Sunraysia Highway (route B220) is a   arterial north-south route in western Victoria. The highway extends north a length of 331 km starting from the Western Freeway near Ballarat to the Calder Highway near Ouyen. It is the north-west arterial road, linking Ballarat and Ouyen, and acts as a secondary route to the Calder Highway), the primary route between Melbourne and Mildura. 

The Sunraysia Highway serves a number of important industries in the region such as agriculture, viticulture, food processing, winemaking and tourism. It forms an important link for these industries to markets and ports in the south of Victoria and South Australia. It is a two-lane, two-way road with shoulders. It has no overtaking lanes provided along the highway, as it is designated as a ‘B’ road for its full length.

History
The passing of the Highways and Vehicles Act of 1924 through the Parliament of Victoria provided for the declaration of State Highways, roads two-thirds financed by the State government through the Country Roads Board (later VicRoads). The North-Western Highway (not to be confused by the Calder Highway, which was also known as the North-Western Highway in the late 1920s) was declared a State Highway in the 1947/48 financial year, from Ballarat via Avoca, St Arnaud, and Donald to Birchip (for a total of 138 miles); before this declaration, the roads were referred to as St Arnaud-Birchip Road, Avoca-St Arnaud Road and Avoca-Ballarat.  In the 1959/60 financial year, another section from Birchip via Woomelang to Lascelles was added, along the former Beulah-Birchip-Wycheproof Road, Kinnabulla-Woomelang Road and Woomelang-Lascelles Roads. The name of the highway was later changed to the Sunraysia Highway on 11 September 1972, and extended from Lascelles to Nunga, just south of Ouyen, subsuming the former portion of Henty Highway previously declared to Ouyen.

The Sunraysia Highway was signed as State Route 121 between Ouyen and Ballarat in 1986; with Victoria's conversion to the newer alphanumeric system in the late 1990s, it was replaced by route B220.

The passing of the Road Management Act 2004 granted the responsibility of overall management and development of Victoria's major arterial roads to VicRoads: in 2013, VicRoads re-declared the road as Sunraysia Highway (Arterial #6700) between the Calder Highway in Nunga (south of Ouyen) and the Western Freeway at Mitchell Park (in north-western Ballarat).

Towns
 Avoca
 Birchip
 Donald
 Learmonth
 Ouyen
 St Arnaud
 Stuart Mill
 Woomelang

Major intersections

See also

 Highways in Australia
 Highways in Victoria

References

External links

Highways in Victoria (Australia)
Mildura